E. Robert (Elie Robert) Schmitz was a Franco-American pianist, teacher, writer, editor, and organizer.

Biography
Schmitz (born February 8, 1889, in Paris) studied with Louis-Joseph Diémer at the Conservatoire de Paris where he won first prize in piano. A protégé of Debussy, Schmitz caught the attention of Camille Saint-Saëns and Vincent D'Indy while directing the Association musicale moderne et artistique (later renamed L'Association de concerts Schmitz) which premiered Debussy's Première rhapsodie, Roussel's Evocations, Le Flem's Crépuscules d'amour, and Milhaud's Suite symphonique. Schmitz lead the Association from 1911-14.

Schmitz toured the United States in 1919 and, the following year, founded the Franco-American Music Society in New York, which incorporated as Pro Musica from 1923-36. During this period, the first American appearances of Bartók and Ravel were sponsored, as well as lectures and concerts by Schoenberg, Prokofiev, and Stravinsky. Schmitz also had a personal and professional friendship with Charles Ives.

Schmitz published his system of piano study, The Capture of Inspiration, in 1935, as well as editions of the Chopin Etudes, the Bach Two-Part Inventions, and other works that included explanatory texts on his method. His book, The Piano Works of Claude Debussy, a technical analysis with commentary, was published posthumously in 1950.  Among his pupils were the composers Samuel Dolin, Harry Somers, and Gertrude Price Wollner.

He recorded the Debussy Preludes, Books I and II, for RCA Victor Records, in addition to other works for Edison Records. 

Schmitz died in San Francisco, California, on September 5, 1949.

References

External links

Modern Ideas in Piano Technic — E. Robert Schmitz (interview), Etude Magazine, August 1925
E. Robert Schmitz Papers, Irving S. Gilmore Music Library, Yale University

1889 births
1949 deaths
Musicians from Paris
20th-century French male classical pianists
Conservatoire de Paris alumni
French emigrants to the United States
20th-century French musicians
Piano pedagogues